Bollezeele (from Dutch; Bollezele in the modern Dutch spelling) is a commune in the Nord department in northern France.

The river Yser runs through Bollezeele.

Language
Bollezeele's local speech is traditionally a Flemish dialect, similar to that spoken on the other side of the border with Belgium; this led to the town's being included in the Atlas Linguarum Europae as one of the Germanic dialects in France (the others were all in either Alsace or Moselle).

Population

Heraldry

See also
Communes of the Nord department

References

Communes of Nord (French department)
French Flanders